Amer Al-Omari (Arabic:عامر العمري) (born 5 January 1983) is a Qatari footballer plays as goalkeeper .

References

External links
 

Qatari footballers
1983 births
Living people
Al-Sailiya SC players
Al-Shamal SC players
Al Kharaitiyat SC players
Al Ahli SC (Doha) players
Al-Khor SC players
Al-Shahania SC players
Muaither SC players
Al-Waab SC players
Place of birth missing (living people)
Qatari people of Yemeni descent
Naturalised citizens of Qatar
Qatar Stars League players
Qatari Second Division players
Association football goalkeepers